The Alfred Ayer House (also known as the James Eagleton House) is a historic house located on US Alternate 27, west of Oklawaha, Florida.

Description and history 
It was added to the National Register of Historic Places on July 13, 1993.

References

External links
 Marion County listings at National Register of Historic Places
 Marion County listings at Florida's Office of Cultural and Historical Programs

Houses on the National Register of Historic Places in Florida
National Register of Historic Places in Marion County, Florida
Houses in Marion County, Florida
Vernacular architecture in Florida